The Puerto Rico Department of Treasury (Departamento de Hacienda) is the executive department of the government of Puerto Rico responsible for the treasury of the U.S. Commonwealth of Puerto Rico. It is one of the constitutionally-created executive departments and is headed by a Secretary.

The department collects taxes, operates the local lottery, and serves as the central disbursement agency of the government.

Agencies
 Office of the Commissioner of Financial Institutions

Secretary

References

External links
  

Executive departments of the government of Puerto Rico
Public debt of Puerto Rico